Ora Engkantada is a Philippine children's fantasy show in 1986. It was hosted by Luz Fernandez, playing as "Lola Torya" while reading from a huge ancient book of magical stories. The show's signature song started as an instrumental but later on, lyrics were added that enhanced the theme of the show. It was originally broadcast by IBC but after the show was cancelled, reruns were broadcast by RPN. It ended in 1990.

References

Fantaserye and telefantasya
Intercontinental Broadcasting Corporation original programming
Radio Philippines Network original programming
1986 Philippine television series debuts
1990 Philippine television series endings
Filipino-language television shows